Music for The Third Policeman is an album by the composer and musician Django Bates and the Powder Room Collapse Orchestra. It was released by Ah Um records in 1990. The album is based on the 1939 comic novel The Third Policeman, written by the Irish author Flann O'Brien.

It was performed live July 2000.

Reception
Allmusic awarded the album with 2.5 stars.

Track listing
 "Ouverture" - 2:13  
 "1st Person" - 5:58 
 "John Divney" - 3:52  
 "Peculiar Terms of Physical Intimacy" - 2:28  
 "Getting the Box (Also an Introduction to De Selby)" - 3:53 
 "Martin Finnucane" - 4:11
 "A Journey is an Hallucination" - 4:54
 "Is it About a Bicycle?" - 3:24
 "Mac Cruiskeen" - 3:22
 "Atoms" - 0:17  
 "Scaffold, Serenity, and One-Legged Army" - 4:34
 "Soft as the Softest Softness" - 4:12 
 "The Beginning" - 3:48

Personnel
Django Bates – keyboards, tenor horn, percussion, trumpet on track 7, saw, bicycle pump 
Steve Buckley – tin whistles, alto saxophones, 2nd clarinet on track 2, bicycle bell 
Steve Berry – cello, double bass at the start and at the end of track 3 
Martin France – drums, percussion, scaffold, crossbar 
Stuart Hall – banjo, violin, 12 string guitar, mandolin, backpedalling 
Sarah Harrison – violin, hooter 
Robert Juritz – bassoon 
Dai Pritchard – clarinet, bass clarinet 
Eddie Parker – bass flute on tracks 5 and 11 
Dave Pattman – bongos on track 12 
Ashley Slater – bass trombone on final note of track 3

References

Django Bates albums
1990 soundtrack albums
Music based on novels